Tragic Week may refer to:

Tragic Week (Argentina), 1919
Tragic Week (Guatemala), 1920
Tragic Week (Spain), 1909